The men's 100 metre breaststroke competition of the swimming events at the 1991 Pan American Games took place on 12 August. The last Pan American Games champion was Richard Korhammer of US.

This race consisted of two lengths of the pool, both lengths being in breaststroke.

Results
All times are in minutes and seconds.

Heats

Final 
The final was held on August 12.

References

Swimming at the 1991 Pan American Games